Gadsden is an unincorporated community in Union Township, Boone County, in the U.S. state of Indiana.

History
A post office was established at Gadsden in 1887, and remained in operation until it was discontinued in 1909.

Geography

References

Unincorporated communities in Boone County, Indiana
Unincorporated communities in Indiana
Indianapolis metropolitan area